Nick Acquaviva (né Nicholas Paul Acquaviva; 27 May 1927 – 2 November 2003), was an American composer, pianist and band leader.

Career 
Acquaviva was born in Beacon, New York, where his father Mike Acquaviva ran a barber shop on Main Street for many years. Like his elder brother Tony Acquaviva, he attended Juilliard and became a professional musician.

During World War II Nick Acquaviva served as Seaman first class in the US Navy. He is buried at Riverside National Cemetery.

The two brothers are often confused, sometimes even conflating them. Adding to the confusion, is the fact that Tony was married to singer Joni James, for whom Nick wrote several songs, including the hit "My Love, My Love".

Selected works 
Among the songs he wrote are:
 "That's What Christmas Means to Me" (1950). Lyrics by Ted Varnick; performed by Eddie Fisher.
 "I Will Love You Forever, My Love" (1952). Lyrics by Ted Varnick; performed by Guy Mitchell.
 "My Love, My Love" (1953). Lyrics by Bob Haymes; performed by Joni James.
 "Why Can't I" (1953). Lyrics by Ted Varnick; performed by Joni James.
 "Unless You're Really Mine" (1953) Ted Varnick (w&m), Nick Acquaviva (w&m)
 "Am I In Love?" (1954). Lyrics by Ted Varnick; performed by Joni James.
 "Is This The End Of The Line?" (1954). Lyrics by Bobby Worth; performed by Joni James.
 "When We Come Of Age" (1954). Lyrics by Norman Gimbel; performed by Joni James.
 "Prayer For Peace" (1955). Lyrics by Norman Gimbel; performed by Jony James and Perry Como.
 "Ghost Town" (1956). Lyrics by Ted Varnick; performed by Don Cherry.
 "Help Me" (1956). Lyrics by Don George; performed by Vic Damone.
 "Somewhere Someone Is Lonely" (1956). Lyrics by Don George; performed by Joni James
 "In The Middle Of An Island" (1957). Lyrics by Ted Varnick; performed by Tony Bennett.
 "Hangin' Around" (1958). Lyrics by Ted Varnick; performed by Guy Mitchell and Richard Hayes.
 "We Know" (1960). Lyrics by Peter Udell; performed by Joni James.
 "Is It Asking Too Much" (1965). Music with Ted Varnick; lyrics by Carl Sigman; performed by Jerry Vale.

Selected discography 
 The Exciting Sound of Acquaviva and His Orchestra
 Decca DL 74465; DL 4465
 
 (the Worldcat entry 36030523 incorrectly attributes the album to Tony Acquaviva)
 "Intermission"
 "Green Valley"
 "Open your eyes"
 "Hills of Rome"
 "Dancing notes"
 "Autumn again"
 "Yesterday's love"
 "A new shade of blue"
 "One look at you"
 "I found a rainbow"
 "A fool was I"
 "C'est la vie"
 "After a dream"

References

Notes

Inline citations 

1927 births
2003 deaths
Songwriters from New York (state)
20th-century American composers
United States Navy personnel of World War II
United States Navy sailors
People from Beacon, New York